Grezzago ( or) is a comune (municipality) in the Province of Milan in the Italian region Lombardy, located about  northeast of Milan.

Grezzago borders the following municipalities: Trezzo sull'Adda, Busnago, Trezzano Rosa, Vaprio d'Adda, Pozzo d'Adda.

Demographic evolution

References

External links
 www.comune.grezzago.mi.it

Cities and towns in Lombardy